(The White Rose and the Red Rose) is an opera in two acts composed by Simon Mayr to an Italian libretto by Felice Romani. It premiered at the Teatro Sant'Agostino, Genoa, on 21 February 1813. Set in England against the backdrop of the Wars of the Roses, Romani's libretto is based on René-Charles Guilbert de Pixérécourt's . Mayr's opera has also been performed under the title Il trionfo dell'amicizia (The triumph of friendship).

Recordings
Label: BMG Ricordi

References

External links
 Mayr, Simon (1820) La rosa bianca e la rosa rossa: Dramma serio per musica. Fantosini (complete libretto published for the 1820 performance at the Teatro della Pergola, Florence, digitized by the Bavarian State Library)
 

Operas by Simon Mayr
Italian-language operas
1813 operas
Operas
Operas set in England
Wars of the Roses
Operas based on plays
Libretti by Felice Romani